Canelo Álvarez vs. Kermit Cintrón was a super-welterweight championship fight for the WBC World title. The fight took place at the Plaza de Toros in Mexico City, Mexico, on 26 November 2011. It was a split-site doubleheader headlined which featured junior lightweight Adrien Broner against separate opponents from Broner's hometown in Cincinnati.

Background

Álvarez

Alvarez made his third defense. He was coming off of the sixth-round knockout of Alfonso Gómez on Sept. 17 in Los Angeles.

Cintrón

A former two-time welterweight beltholder, Cintrón has battled to a disputed draw with RING middleweight titleholder Sergio Martínez, been stopped twice by ex-beltholder Antonio Margarito and lost a four-round technical decision to former two-time beltholder Paul Williams
The hard-hitting Cintrón was coming off of a 10-round unanimous decision over Antwone Smith in August that helped him to rebound from a 10-round unanimous decision loss to Carlos Molina in July.

Undercard

Televised
Super Welterweight Championship bout:  Canelo Álvarez (c) vs.  Kermit Cintrón
Álvarez defeats Cintrón via technical knockout at 2:53 of the fifth round.

Preliminary card
Featherweight bout:  Salvador Sánchez II vs.  Alexander Monterrosa	
Sánchez defeats Monterrosa via split decision.
Lightweight bout:  Daniel Estrada vs.  Carlos Parra

Middleweight bout:  Gilberto Ramirez Sanchez vs.  Samuel Miller
Sanchez defeats Miller via technical knockout of the fourth round.
Middleweight bout:  Nobuhiro Ishida vs.  Edson Espinoza
Ishida defeats Espinoza via technical knockout of the first round.
Bantamweight bout:  Andrés Gutiérrez vs.  Franklin Varela

Bantamweight bout:  Willy Velazquez vs.  Jesus Ceja
Velazquez defeats Ceja via unanimous decision.
Light Flyweight bout:  Saul Juarez vs.  Oswaldo Novoa

Super Flyweight bout:  Léo Santa Cruz vs.  Jorge Romero
Cruz defeats Romero via technical knockout at 1:10 of the third round.
Bantamweight bout:  Ramiro Robles vs.  Efren Bautista

Result
Alvarez defeated Cintron via technical knockout in the fifth round of the match.

International broadcasting

See also
 Mexico–Puerto Rico boxing rivalry

References

External links

Cintron
2011 in boxing
Boxing in Mexico
Sports competitions in Mexico City
2011 in Mexican sports
Boxing on HBO
Golden Boy Promotions
November 2011 sports events in Mexico